David Ivon Jones (18 October 1883 – 13 April 1924) was a Welsh Communist, newspaper editor, and political prisoner, most famous as a leading opponent of South African racial segregation and for being one of the first white activists in South Africa to fight for equal rights for black South Africans. Jones was also one of the founders of the Communist Party of South Africa, and in 1917 played a leading role in the formation of South Africa's first all-black trade union, the Industrial Workers of Africa (IWA). Later in life he became one of the first people to translate Vladimir Lenin's works into English. He also started some of the first night-classes for African workers, and in 1919 was convicted and imprisoned for publishing a leaflet supporting both communism and racial equality, in what was the first major court case against communism in South Africa's history. He is credited as being the most influential South African socialist of his time.

Upon first arriving in South Africa in 1910, Jones was a Christian Liberal and became a supporter of the pro-segregationist party, the South African Labour Party (SALP), becoming their general secretary in 1914. However, shortly afterwards he resigned as the leader of the SALP in 1915, became a Communist and an atheist, and spent the remainder of his life fighting against racial segregation, capitalism, and colonialism. In later life, Jones's became a strong supporter of the Bolsheviks and their leader Vladimir Lenin, who in turn was impressed with Jones's reports of class and racial divisions in South Africa.

Jones was also a supporter of the Communist Party of Great Britain (CPGB) and is considered an iconic figure and hero by many socialist and anti-apartheid political parties, including the South African Communist Party, the Communist Party of Britain, and the African National Congress. According to historian Baruch Hirson, Jones's early Welsh nationalist and love of Welsh literature gave him a "life-long hatred of tyranny and national oppression".

Early life, family and background

Childhood and family 
David Ivon Jones was born on 18 October 1883, in Aberystwyth a town located in Wales. His parents died when he was very young, leaving him to be raised by various family members. In both Aberystwyth and Lampeter, Jones worked as a grocer in the family business. The Jones family hailed from a poor and mountainous farming region of Wales called Mynydd-Bach, which had once been the centre of a guerrilla war of small farmers and squatters fighting against attempts by English landowners to enclose common land. His grandfather, John Ivan Jones, was a leading campaigner for radical causes and Liberalism in Aberystwyth. It is believed that his grandfather's beliefs were a strong influence on David Ivon Jones.

Early religious beliefs 
In his youth, he became strongly influenced by the beliefs of the former Unitarian minister George Eyre Evans, inspiring Jones to abandon his family's Calvinistic Methodist beliefs and adopt Unitarianism. In 1901 Jones moved to live in Lampeter where he encountered many differing views on Christianity before returning to his native Aberystwyth and joining the Unitarian congregation. Jones was often berated by his neighbours for his Unitarianist beliefs and confronted by religious opponents at his workplace and on the streets for his choice to join the people of the 'Y Smotyn Du' (The Black Spot). Among Jones's shop account records, it was discovered by historians that Jones had an interest in philosophy, often writing quotes by Immanuel Kant and Plato. According to historian Baruch Hirson, Jones's early Welsh nationalist and love of Welsh literature gave him a "life-long hatred of tyranny and national oppression". Jones became the treasurer and secretary of the Aberystwyth Unitarian chapel, which soon developed into a centre for radical left-wing politics. The records of this chapel show that striking miners were invited by the congregation and that the congregation also raised money for Penrhyn quarrymen who had been locked out of work for three years. The chapel records also show that the congregation hosted Gertrude von Petzold who was famous for being the first woman to be ordained in Britain.

According to researcher Islwyn ap Nicholas, Jones was at this point a "Christian humanist:"Ivon appeared to be a Christian Humanist, unless this is a contradiction in terms. Indeed he was more of a humanist than anything else and he always stressed the social and economic teachings of Jesus".

Leaving Wales 
At some point during his 20s, Jones contracted tuberculosis, a common disease in Wales in the early 20th century. Records from his chapel note that Jones left Cardiganshire "to seek health in New Zealand", following many people in his family who had migrated to British colonies. In 1907 Jones left Wales and then spent three years living in New Zealand. In 1920 Jones moved to the Orange Free State in South Africa where he worked in a shop which was owned by two of his brothers.

Activities in South Africa (1910-1920)

Arrival in Africa (1911) 
David Ivon Jones arrived in South Africa in November 1910, seeking treatment for tuberculosis. Before arriving in South Africa, Jones had admired the Boers and their resistance to British imperialism during two wars, and viewed them as a brave and heroic force of resistance against "the machinations of Randlordism." However, he soon became disenchanted with the Boers, viewing them as ignorant and bigoted, and viewed their beliefs as similar to the Calvinists he knew in Wales. Early during his arrival in South Africa, Jones became increasingly aware of the oppression of native black Africans, especially women, viewing their oppressed position in racist South African society as 'slaves in everything but name'. Although at this point in his life Jones still held many bigoted views towards Africans, witnessing the oppression of black people in South Africa triggered Jones to begin questioning his own views on race, and his views gradually became more ambivalent. Although he had not yet broken with segregation, Jones's writings from mid-1911 record his gradual shift in attitudes towards black people, attacking people who used derogatory language against black workers.Further commenting on his early views on the mistreatment of black workers, Jones writes: "the white man only considers his marketable value. When he begins to find that he has responsibilities towards the black man other than sending him missionaries, there will be a changed South Africa'.

South African Labour Party - SALP (1911-1915) 
In 1911, Jones welcomed the creation of the "South African Native National Congress", later becoming the African National Congress (ANC), viewing its creation as a step towards 'national self-consciousness'. Despite his sympathetic views for black Africans and the ANC, David Ivon Jones was at this point in his life a Liberal Christian activist, and in 1911 Jones joined a pro-segregationist political party called the "South African Labour Party" (SALP). Although not yet an anti-capitalist and supporter of Communism, Jones held a deep hatred towards South Africa's Randlords, the capitalists who monopolised the gold and diamond industries.

The Witwatersrand uprising (1913) 
During his time in the SALP, many events in South African politics would force him to reconsider his Liberal and Christian beliefs, and pushed him to become a revolutionary communist and an atheist. In May/June 1913 the British military crushed an uprising of white workers near Witwatersrand, plunging the province into a civil war. The strike started as a peaceful event at the New Kleinfontein mine, with miners angry and bitter over issues of work time and deaths by disease. Soon afterwards, martial law was declared to stop attempts by workers to start a general strike, events that further pushed Jones's political beliefs towards Marxist socialism. The government immediately sent troops to crush the strike and using dragoons to indiscriminately fire their guns towards fleeing civilians, killing 20 and wounding 200–400. The government's murder of unarmed and innocent civilians would plunge Johannesburg into further chaos, crowds rioted and burnt down the railway station and the Star newspaper. Rioters also looted the city centre, and anti-Indian violence began spreading across South Africa. Hearing of these events, Jones left his job as a clerk in a power station and dedicated himself to supporting unionised miners. The SALP also became a target of government oppression, with the party's printing machines destroyed and their offices raided by government troops. During this time Jones barely escaped being arrested and deported.

Turn towards communism and atheism (1914-1915) 
In August 1914 Jones was elected the SALP's general secretary, during a time when its membership and popular support was rapidly expanding. The large increase in membership and support transformed the SALP, and the wave of new overwhelmingly white working-class members brought with them bigoted views towards black Africans, with many of these new members arguing that they should be paid more than black people. Many older SALP members agreed and the party stuck to its racist and pro-segregationist beliefs. While many of these new members moved further politically right-wing, some veterans of the party including Jones himself began moving further left-wing.

Come 1914, Jones underwent a personal crisis, he became depressed and stopped attending church as often. He began collecting left-wing political and philosophical publications from Britain, including works by Karl Marx, Friedrich Engels, Karl Kautsky, H. G. Wells, Leo Tolstoy, Ramsay MacDonald, and began studying a vast range of political philosophies, including Marxism. When he emerged from his depression, he found a new enthusiasm for political work and had completely abandoned his previous Christian beliefs.

Come the outbreak of the First world war, the SALP membership was split over whether or not to support the war, with many of those opposing WWI then co-founding the "War on War League" in September 1914. The War on War League claimed to be an independent body of anti-war activists that worked within the SALP, and although Jones did not join them he did share their views. Jones's firm opposition to WWI, along with his growing socialist and atheist beliefs heavily influenced by British socialist publications, led to him resigning as the SALP general secretary in September 1915 and became the leader of a breakaway group called the International Socialist League (ISL). After leaving the SALP, Jones dedicate the remainder of his life to promoting racial equality and fighting against both colonialism and capitalism.

Jones became the first editor of the ISL's weekly newspaper titled The International which he used to support Vladimir Lenin and the Bolsheviks and to later in his life use to explain the importance of Russia's 1917 February and October revolutions. The ISL would later become the nucleus of the Communist Party of South Africa, which would recognise David Ivon Jones as a founding member.

Support for black Africans (1915-1920) 
After leaving the South African Labour Party (SALP) in 1915, David Ivon Jones dedicated the remainder of his life to supporting both communism and supporting racial equality between black and white workers. In 1917 Jones became the moving figure in establishing South Africa's first-ever all-black trade union, a short-lived organisation known as the Industrial Workers of Africa (IWA). Jones wrote agitation leaflets for the IWA  addressed to the Bantu calling for racial equality and proletarian solidarity, however when he could not find a translator the work of translating the leaflets fell upon undercover police spies who had been sent to infiltrate the IWA. The IWA took part in many strikes and industrial disputes in 1918, however the organisation was crushed via a combination of government repression and police infiltration.

Becoming increasingly aware of the potential of black South Africans in the labour movement, Jones prompted the International Socialist League (ISL) to start publishing socialist works in native African languages, demanding equal status for Black Africans in South African workplaces, and challenging colonial racism. During this time in his life, the importance of racial equality between the black and white proletariat became the central focus of his writings. Statements such as the following published by Jones in The International became common sights within his writings."An Internationalism which does not concede the fullest rights which the Native working class is capable of claiming will be a sham. One of the justifications for our withdrawal from the Labour Party is that it gives us untrammelled freedom to deal, regardless of political fortunes, with the great and fascinating problem of the Native."Due to ill health, Jones resigned from his position in the ISL in 1919 and briefly worked in Mozambique where he contracted malaria.

The Bolsheviks are Coming! (1919) 
In 1919 David Ivon Jones, working alongside activist LHH Greene, co-authored a leaflet promoting both communism and racial equality. This leaflet titled The Bolsheviks are Coming was written and distributed in Pietermaritzburg, and was addressed 'to the workers of South Africa, Black as well as White'. Written in English, Zulu, and Sotho, The Bolsheviks are Coming! declared that: "While the Black worker is oppressed, the white worker cannot be free."The publishing of this leaflet would gain the attention of the South African government, which sought to censor its spread and punish the authors for promoting communism and racial equality. Both Jones and Greene were arrested, fined, and sentenced to four months in prison for the crime of publishing "The Bolsheviks are Coming!". However, this sentence was quashed on appeal. This court case is notable for being the first major court case against communism in South African history.

Departure from Africa to Europe (1920-1924) 

In 1920 before permanently departing from South Africa later that year, one of the last major actions David Ivon Jones did was to co-found communist themed night schools for black workers in South Africa, along with famous botanist Eddie Roux. These night schools became some of the first recorded instances of night schools for black workers in the history of South Africa.

In November 1920, David Ivon Jones left South Africa for Europe, but due to his declining health stayed in Nice. In March 1921 while still living in Nice, Jones wrote a report for the executive committee of the Communist International (ECCI) titled Communism in South Africa. This report was a highly detailed and erudite survey of the complex political, social and economic conditions of South Africa, with a heavy emphasis on analysing the country's racial and class divisions. It is believed by researchers of communist history that Jones's survey had a major impact on Vladimir Lenin.

Life in Russia 
After briefly visiting his home country of Wales, Jones was invited to the 1921 Third Congress of the Communist International held in Moscow, as a delegate from South Africa, alongside political activist Sam Barlin. On 12 July at the Third Congress of the Communist International, Jones proposed that the congress:"resolves to further the movement among the working masses of Africa ... and desires the Executive to take a direct initiative in promoting the awakening of the African Negroes as a necessary step to the world revolution".Further elaborating on his views on communism and black Africans, Jones said:"They (black Africans) are ripe for communism. They are absolutely propertyless. They are stripped of every vestige of property and caste prejudice. The African natives are a labouring race, still fresh from ancestral communal traditions. I will not say that the native workers are well organised, or have a great conception of communism or even trade unionism, as yet. But they have made several attempts at liberation by way of industrial solidarity. They only need awakening. They know they are slaves, but lack the knowledge how to free themselves ... The solution of the problem, the whole world problem is being worked out in South Africa on the field of the working-class movement".After hearing Jones's speech, the congress agreed that he should represent South Africa as a consultant to the Comintern executive committee. Due to his failing health, Jones remained in Moscow and was not able to attend the founding congress of the Communist Party of South Africa (SACP) near the end of July. Despite not being present at the founding congress to his failing health, the party still recognised Jones as a founding member. Distancing himself from frontline political activism due to his failing health, Jones dedicated his time to learning Russian and became one of the first people to translate much of Lenin's writings into English. He also wrote many articles for publications in Britain, America, and for South African communists. Writing for The Communist Review in February 1922, the journal of the Communist Party of Great Britain (CPGB), Jones expressed his support for the Bolshevik's support for radical peasants in the fight against the Russian Orthodox Church. Jones's writings in 1924 show that he was actively encouraging English speaking socialists to read and study the works of Vladimir Lenin, alongside other Russian political figures including Martov and Plekhanov. The years of political turmoil had taken a toll on Jones's health, and so the Comintern dispatched him to Yalta to recover from another tuberculosis attack. Writing to South African communist leader WH Bill Andrews, Jones wrote: "We stand for Bolshevism, and in all minds Bolshevism stands for the Native worker".

In July 1923 Jones wrote an article titled "Africa Awakening" in support of the creation of a "World Negro Congress", and further urged white activists in Belgium, Britain and America to put special emphasis on the liberation of African people from racism and capitalism.

In a final political testament written on his deathbed, David Ivon Jones urged his fellow communists to continue supporting revolution against imperialism and capitalism, and to "carry out the great revolutionary mission imposed on colonies in general and South Africa in particular with revolutionary devotion and dignity, concentrating on shaking the foundations of world capitalism and British imperialism".

Soon afterwards, Jones died on 13 April 1924 from tuberculosis.

Death and legacy (1924-present) 
After his death from tuberculosis on 13 April 1924, David Ivon Jones was buried in Moscow's famous Novodevichy Cemetery, as a reward by Russian communists for his commitment to socialism. Later buried alongside him were two former leaders of the Communist Party of South Africa, JB Marks and Moses Kotane. There is also a memorial dedicated to David Ivon Jones in Aberystwyth's Unitarian chapel.

In 2005 a motion was put forward to the UK Parliament to recognise David Ivon Jones's dedication to improving the working conditions of South African workers. This motion was signed by 33 Members of Parliament, including Jeremy Corbyn.

Shortly after Nelson Mandela's death in 2013, a remembrance service was held for David Ivon Jones, praising him for his fight against apartheid and recognising that Nelson Mandela's struggle against apartheid was a continuation of Jones's struggle for racial equality in South Africa.

In 2015 a delegation of 20 representatives of the South African embassy and government visited Novodevichy cemetery to return the remains of Marks and Kotane back to South Africa, as requested by their surviving families. While in the cemetery, the delegation also paid their respects to the grave of David Ivon Jones.

In 2015, Jones was voted 30th of the "50 most influential Welsh politicians of all time" in a poll by readers of Wales Online.

His legacy is highly regarded by both the African National Congress, and the Communist Party of South Africa.

Jones's biography was written by Professor Gwyn Alf Williams and Baruch Hirson, and published in 1995. Archival papers relevant to the study of David Ivon Jones can be found at Swansea University.

Works 

 The Bolsheviks are Coming! (1919)
 Bolshevism and Church Property (1922)
Africa Awakening (1923)
 Lenin's First Book (1924)

See also 

 Claudia Jones
 Vic Allen
 Paul Robeson
 Kwame Nkrumah
 Harry Pollitt
 Nelson Mandela

References 

Apartheid in South Africa
Anti-apartheid activists
Welsh communists
Human rights activists
Socialist politicians
South African communists
Welsh Marxist writers
1883 births
1924 deaths
Tuberculosis deaths in the Soviet Union
People from Aberystwyth
South African expatriates in the Soviet Union
Tuberculosis deaths in Russia